Stolonifera is a suborder of soft corals in the order Alcyonacea. Members of this taxon are characterised by having separate polyps budding off an encrusting horizontal, branching stolon. The skeletons include spicules or consists of a horny external cuticle. These soft corals are found in shallow tropical and temperate seas.

Families 
According to the World Register of Marine Species, the following families are included in this suborder:

 Acrossotidae
 Arulidae
 Clavulariidae
 Coelogorgiidae
 Cornulariidae
 Pseudogorgiidae
 Tubiporidae

References 

Alcyonacea
 
Cnidarian suborders